The Küçükçekmece Bridge, also known as the Küçükçekmece Mimar Sinan Bridge, is a stone arch bridge in Küçükçekmece district of Istanbul, Turkey. It was built by Ottoman  architect Mimar Sinan and was completed in 1560.

History
A stone bridge, which was built in 558 by Eastern Roman emperor Justinian I (reigned 527–565), stood on the place of the Ottoman bridge.  A new masonry bridge was later built on the same place by Byzantine emperor Basil I (r. 867–886). The historic Byzantine bridge was demolished over the time following earthquakes and invasions. The Ottoman bridge was built by the chief architect Mimar Sinan (c. 1488/1490–1588) during the reign of Ottoman Sultan Suleiman the Magnificent (r. 1520–1566).

Characteristics
The Küçükçekmece Bridge is located at southeaster shore of the Lake Küçükçekmece  
on the mouth of a creek, which flows between the Lake Küçükçekmece and Marmara Sea, and is situated in south-north direction. It runs through an islet, which is used as an urban park, in its halfway. The asymmetric bridge's highest place is at north, where the biggest arch is situated as the last arch of the bridge.

Restorations
It underwent restorations in 1735 and 1861. During World War II years, the bridge was widened. In 1996, it was restored by the Metropolitan Municipality within a project approved through the Board of Preservation of Cultural and Natural Assets of Istanbul. Latest restoration of the historic bridge was completed in 2008 after three-year work, which cost  1.3 million (approx. US$0.85 million). The restoration revealed also that the bridge has 13 arches instead of 12 as known before.

References

Arch bridges in Turkey
Stone bridges in Turkey
Mimar Sinan buildings
Bridges completed in 1560
Ottoman bridges in Turkey
Buildings and structures in Istanbul
Former road bridges in Turkey
Pedestrian bridges in Turkey
Küçükçekmece